Frederick Cohen may refer to:

 Fritz Cohen (Frederick A. Cohen, 1904–1967), German composer
 Frederick R. Cohen (1945–2022), American mathematician specializing in algebraic topology
 Fred Cohen (born 1956), American computer scientist
 Freddie Cohen (born 1957), British businessman and politician